Ben Easter is an American actor and photographer.

Easter made his film debut in 2000 in Cora Unashamed. He was later a repeated costar of Mary-Kate and Ashley Olsen, appearing alongside them in the film Holiday in the Sun and the television series So Little Time. He has also appeared in Pearl Harbor, Zenon: Z3, and I'll Always Know What You Did Last Summer.

Easter began working as a professional photographer in 2008, and his photographs have since been featured in Icon, Glamaholic, Yoga Iowa, and DSM Magazine. An exhibit of his at the Polk County Jail in Des Moines, Iowa, titled "Confliction", was later restaged in Paris by UNESCO. He has worked for Wilhelmina Models and Next Management, and was one of the photographers for the 2012 Obama presidential campaign. In addition to his photography, Easter also works as a yoga instructor.

In 1998, Easter was selected as one of "America's Most Wanted Men" by Cosmopolitan.

Filmography

Film

Television

References

External links
 
 Ben Easter Photography

21st-century American male actors
American male film actors
American male television actors
American photographers
Living people
Place of birth missing (living people)
American yoga teachers
20th-century American male actors